Leonta Horace "Onty" Beer (11 February 1903 – 12 February 1966) was an Australian rules footballer who played with South Melbourne in the Victorian Football League (VFL).

Family
The son of Arthur Wills Beer (1856-1925), and Rose Edith Beer (1863-1929), née Newman, Leonta Horace Beer was born at Townsville, Queensland on 11 February 1903  known as "Onty" (sometimes "Ontie"), he was named "Leonta" after the devastating 1903 Townsville cyclone, identified as such by the Queensland State Government meteorologist C.L. Wragge.

He married Isabella Ivy Brown (1900-1949) in 1922.

Football

Yarraville (MJFA)

South Melbourne (VFL)

Williamstown (VFA)
Having tried out with Footscray in the preseason, he played his first game for Williamstown, against Hawthorn on 7 June 1924.

Yarraville (VFA)

Notes

References
 Holmesby, Russell & Main, Jim (2014), The Encyclopedia of AFL Footballers: every AFL/VFL player since 1897 (10th ed.), Seaford, Victoria: BAS Publishing.

External links 
 
 
 Leon  "Monty" Beer, at The VFA Project.
 "Beer, _Yville29", at The VFA Project.

1903 births
1966 deaths
Australian rules footballers from Victoria (Australia)
Sydney Swans players
Yarraville Football Club players